Biao may refer to:

Culture
Biao language

People
Lin Biao (1907 – 1971), Chinese communist military leader
Liu Biao (142 – 208), Chinese warlord and the governor of Jing Province during the late Han Dynasty
Yuen Biao (born 1957), Hong Kong-based actor
Ban Biao (3 – 54), Chinese historian
Fu Biao (1963 – 2005), Chinese actor
Ma Biao (politician), Communist party politician
Ma Biao (general), Chinese Muslim Major-General

Places
Mount Biao, volcanic peak in Equatorial Guinea

See also
Piao (disambiguation)